The Dr. Daniel Adams House is a historic house at 324 Main Street in Keene, New Hampshire. Built about 1795, it is a good example of transitional Federal-Greek Revival architecture, with a well documented history of alterations by its first owner. The house was listed on the National Register of Historic Places in 1989.

Description and history
The Dr. Daniel Adams House is located south of downtown Keene, on the east side of Main Street at its junction with Gates Road. It is a 2½-story wood-frame structure, with a front-facing gabled roof, four interior chimneys, and clapboarded exterior. It is predominantly Greek Revival in styling, with a five-bay front facade topped by a pedimented gable, in which there are two small sash windows. The front entry is sheltered by what was formerly a porch, but is now an enclosed vestibule with gabled roof. A two-story ell extends to the rear of the main block. There are significant surviving Federal-style details on the interior.

The house was built about 1795 by Doctor Daniel Adams, a prominent local physician who also served as the town postmaster for a time. Adams undertook a number of alterations, restylings, and enlargements of the house prior to his death in 1830. His son, also a doctor, is probably responsible for the conversion of its original hip roof to the gabled one seen today.  Its only major alteration since then was the addition of a bay window on the north side during the Victorian period, and the enclosing of the entry porch in the 20th century.

See also
National Register of Historic Places listings in Cheshire County, New Hampshire

References

Houses on the National Register of Historic Places in New Hampshire
Federal architecture in New Hampshire
Greek Revival houses in New Hampshire
Houses completed in 1795
Houses in Cheshire County, New Hampshire
Buildings and structures in Keene, New Hampshire
National Register of Historic Places in Cheshire County, New Hampshire